Gumbetovo (Gömbät) is a rural locality (a village) in Verkhneyaushevsky Selsoviet, Fyodorovsky District, Bashkortostan, Russia. The population was 2 as of 2010. There is 1 street.

Geography 
Gumbetovo is located 18 km east of Fyodorovka (the district's administrative centre) by road. Maganevka is the nearest rural locality.

References 

Rural localities in Fyodorovsky District